Theoris of Lemnos (died before 323 BC) was an ancient Greek woman from Lemnos who lived in Athens in the fourth century BC.  She worked as a witch or folk-healer.  At some point before 323, she was tried and executed along with her children, though the precise details of her offence are unclear.  Three ancient accounts survive of her prosecution, which constituted the most detailed account of a witch trial to survive from Classical Greece.

Accounts

The trial of Theoris of Lemnos is the best-known of several classical Athenian trials of women who practiced magic; it is also the best-attested, appearing in three ancient sources.  The earliest and most detailed source is Demosthenes' speech Against Aristogeiton, which was addressed to jurors in the trial of Aristogeiton, an Athenian orator.  The speech mentions Theoris because of her connection to Eunomus, the brother of Aristogeiton.  The speaker attempts to persuade the jury that Eunomus' testimony should be ignored, in part because of his own questionable past, and his involvement in the affair which, according to the speaker, caused Theoris to be convicted and executed.

The brief account of Theoris' trial given in Demosthenes' speech seems to assume that the jury will have been familiar with the trial, suggesting that Theoris' case was well-known.  Two later versions of the story of Theoris also survive, both based on the one in Against Aristogeiton.  One is by the Hellenistic atthidographer Philochorus, cited by Harpocration in the second century AD; the other is from Plutarch's biography of Demosthenes, which also dates to the second century AD.  Plutarch's account of the case seems to conflate the story of Theoris with that of another woman mentioned in the speeches of Demosthenes, Ninos, who was executed in the 350s or 340s BC – apparently for performing rites which mocked the Dionysian mysteries.

Life
Theoris was originally from the island of Lemnos, but lived in Athens.  Lemnos had been controlled by Athens since 390 BC, and so Theoris may have been an Athenian citizen; alternatively she may have been one of the "dispossessed" Lemnians who were not from Athenian settlements on the island.  Theoris had children, but there is no mention of a husband in the ancient sources. Her children may have been fathered by Eunomus, the brother of Aristogeiton, though Demosthenes' text is not clear on this.  Her household also included the maidservant who, according to Demosthenes, denounced Theoris, which suggests that she had some level of wealth.  

Theoris was apparently some kind of magic user. These two descriptions are not necessarily incompatible: though the terms  and  both have specific meanings, magic users in ancient Greece did not necessarily restrict themselves to one type of supernatural activity, and the same person might both tell fortunes and supply . According to Demosthenes, Eunomus – who acquired Theoris' potions and incantations after her death – claimed to be able to cure epilepsy, and Theoris may also have claimed that her  could heal. Plutarch describes Theoris as a hiereia or priestess – though, unusually for Plutarch, does not identify the deity she served – but he may be conflating her with Ninos.

Some time before 323 Theoris was put on trial in Athens, convicted, and executed along with her children.  Plutarch claims that the prosecution was brought by Demosthenes.  It is not certain exactly what crime Theoris was charged with, as the surviving ancient sources differ.  According to Demosthenes it was for casting incantations and using harmful drugs; Philochorus reports that she was charged with asebeia (impiety); and Plutarch says that she was convicted of "committing many misdeeds and teaching the slaves to deceive".

Crime
Most of the scholarly attention to the case of Theoris has focused on identifying the exact charge which was brought against her, which is complicated by the brevity of and inconsistencies between the three ancient sources which discuss her.

In classical Athens, using magic was not in itself criminal, though using potions or drugs to kill was. Derek Collins suggests that Theoris was probably charged with this crime, intentional homicide by poisoning. If that were the case, she would have been tried before the Areopagus. As Theoris' family were executed with her, Collins argues that the former scenario is more likely.  

In classical Athens, the law against  potentially applied to a very wide variety of possible actions: the law probably did not define what constituted impiety, and it will have been the responsibility of the prosecutor to show that the accused's actions were covered under the law. Michael Rinella argues that sorcery could be prosecuted under the law against impiety. However, Collins argues that this was not the case, as aside from Theoris there is no evidence for the prosecution of witches in classical Athens.

Esther Eidinow suggests that Theoris's offences were more to do with offending religious or social sensibilities. She argues that if Theoris had been prosecuted for homicide, the charge would have been described more explicitly in Against Aristogeiton – as it is in Antiphon's speech Against the Stepmother for Poisoning which uses the word  ('homicide') to describe a similar crime.

Notes

References

Works cited
 
 
 
 
 
 
 
 
 
 
 
 

4th-century BC deaths
Ancient Lemnos
Year of birth unknown
4th-century BC Greek people
People from Lemnos
People executed for witchcraft
4th-century BC Greek women
Ancient businesswomen
Ancient Greek businesspeople